is a town located in Fukushima Prefecture, Japan. ,  the town had an estimated population of 13,810 in 5309 households, and a population density of 35 persons per km². It is noted as the birthplace of the famous doctor Hideyo Noguchi, who contributed to knowledge in the fight against syphilis and yellow fever.

Geography
Inawashiro is located in the far north of the Aizu region of Fukushima Prefecture, bordering Yamagata Prefecture to the north and Lake Inawashiro to the south.

Mountains : Mount Bandai, Mount Adatara, Mount Azuma-kofuji
Rivers : Nagase River
Lakes : Lake Inawashiro, Akimoto Lake

Neighboring municipalities
Fukushima Prefecture
Aizuwakamatsu
Fukushima
Nihonmatsu
Kōriyama
Kitashiobara
Bandai
Yamagata Prefecture
Yonezawa

Climate
Inawashiro has a Humid continental climate (Köppen Dfa) characterized by warm summers and cold winters with heavy snowfall.  The average annual temperature in Inawashiro is 10.0 °C. The average annual rainfall is 1367 mm with September as the wettest month. The temperatures are highest on average in August, at around 23.5 °C, and lowest in January, at around -2.4 °C.

Demographics
Per Japanese census data, the population of Inawashiro has declined steadily over the past 40 years.

History
The area of present-day Inawashiro was part of ancient Mutsu Province and the location of Inawashiro Castle since the Kamakura period. It was the site of the Battle of Suriagehara during the Sengoku period. The area formed part of the holdings of Aizu Domain during the Edo period. During the Boshin War, the Battle of Bonari Pass took place near Inawashiro. After the Meiji Restoration, the area was organized as part of Yama District, Fukushima Prefecture. The town of Inawashiro was founded with the establishment of the modern municipalities system on April 1, 1898. The town borders expanded considerably in 1955 through a merger with the villages of Iwase, Iwaho, Azauma, Nagase, Tsukinowa, Chisato, and Okinajima.

Economy
The economy of Inawashiro is based on tourism and agriculture. Primary agricultural crops include buckwheat and rice, along with tomatoes, dairy farming and miso. There are many ski resorts, onsen and leisure facilities at Lake Inawashiro. Sulfur mining, formerly a mainstay of the local economy, ended with the closure of the last mine in 1968.

Education
Inawashiro has six public elementary schools and three public junior high schools operated by the town government. The town has one public high school operated by the Fukushima Prefectural Board of Education. The prefecture also operates one special education school.

Transportation

Railway
 JR East – Ban'etsu West Line
  -  -  -  -

Highway
  – Inawashiro-Bandai Kogen IC

Local attractions
 Tenkyōkaku, a Meiji-period former residence of Prince Arisugawa Takehito, designated an Important Cultural Property (ICP)
 Noguchi Hideyo Memorial Hall
Lake Inawashiro
 former Okinashima Villa of Prince Takamatsu (ICP)
 former Baba residence (ICP)
 Aizu-Matsudiara clan cemetery, National historic site

Noted people from Inawashiro
Hideyo Noguchi, bacteriologist
Yumeko Aizome, actress

See also 
Mount Bandai
Lake Inawashiro

References

External links

Official Website 

Towns in Fukushima Prefecture
Inawashiro, Fukushima